Myriostoma capillisporum is a fungal species in the family Geastraceae. Basidiocarps resemble earthstars, but the spore sac is supported by multiple columns (instead of a single column) and has multiple ostioles instead of a single, apical ostiole. The fungus was originally described as a variety of Myriostoma coliforme, based on the distinctive and conspicuous ornamentation of its basidiospores. Recent molecular research, based on cladistic analysis of DNA sequences, has shown that it is a separate species, so far only known from South Africa.

References

fungi of Africa
Geastraceae